Semisulcospira reiniana is a species of freshwater snail with an operculum, an aquatic gastropod mollusk in the family Semisulcospiridae.

Taxonomy
Semisulcospira reiniana belong to the Semisulcospira libertina species complex.

Distribution 
This species occurs in Japan.

Parasites
Parasites of Semisulcospira reiniana include:
 Heterophyidae: Semisulcospira reiniana serves as the first intermediate host for Metagonimus yokogawai.

References

External links

Semisulcospiridae